SS General von Steuben was a German passenger liner and later an armed transport ship of the German Navy that was sunk in the Baltic Sea during World War II. She was launched in 1923 as München (after the German city, sometimes spelled Muenchen), renamed General von Steuben in 1930 (after the famous German officer of the American Revolutionary War), and renamed Steuben in 1938.

During World War II, the ship served as a troop accommodation vessel, and from 1944 as an armed transport. On 10 February 1945, while evacuating German military personnel, wounded soldiers, and civilian refugees during Operation Hannibal, the ship was torpedoed by the Soviet submarine S-13 and sank. An estimated 4,000 people lost their lives in the sinking.

Early history

In 1923, München became the first German trans-Atlantic passenger liner to be launched, and also the first to enter New York Harbor, since the end of World War I. She arrived in July 1923 on her maiden transatlantic voyage.

1930 fire and sinking
On 11 February 1930, after München docked in New York City and discharged passengers and most of her crew from a voyage from Bremen, Germany, a fire broke out in a paint locker on board and quickly spread to another storage hold. The massive fire and explosion resulted in a five-alarm fire and all of the city's fire equipment was sent to the burning ship. The fire could not be controlled and the ship sank next to the wharf where it had docked.

In one of the largest shipping salvage efforts of its time, München was raised, towed to a dry dock, repaired, and returned to service. Shortly afterwards, the ship's owner renamed her General von Steuben.

World War II
The ship, now called Steuben, was commissioned in 1939 as a Kriegsmarine accommodation ship. In 1944, she was pressed into service as an armed transport ship, taking German troops to eastern Baltic ports and returning wounded troops to Kiel.

Operation Hannibal
The Operation Hannibal evacuations surpassed the British evacuation at Dunkirk in both size of the operation and number of people evacuated.

By early January 1945, Grossadmiral Karl Dönitz realized that Germany was soon to be defeated. Wishing to save his submariners, he radioed a coded message on 23 January 1945 to the Baltic Sea port of Gotenhafen (the Polish city and port of Gdynia under German occupation) to evacuate to the West, under the code name Operation Hannibal.

Submariners at that point were schooled and housed in ships floating in the Baltic ports, most of them at Gotenhafen.

Notwithstanding the losses suffered during the operation, over two million people were evacuated ahead of the Red Army's advance into East Prussia and Danzig (now Gdańsk, Poland).

In the winter of 1945, East Prussian refugees headed west, away from the city of Königsberg and ahead of the Soviet advance into the Baltic States and East Prussia. Thousands fled to the Baltic seaport at Pillau (now Baltiysk, Russia), hoping to board ships that would carry them to the relative safety of Western Germany. Steuben was part of the fleet sent for the purpose.

Final voyage
On 9 February 1945, the 14,660-ton Steuben sailed from Pillau, near Königsberg on the Baltic coast, for Swinemünde (now Świnoujście, Poland). Official reports listed 2,800 wounded German soldiers; 800 civilians; 100 returning soldiers; 270 navy medical personnel (including doctors, nurses and auxiliaries); 12 nurses from Pillau; 64 crew for the ship's anti-aircraft guns, 61 naval personnel, radio operators, signal men, machine operators and administrators, plus 160 merchant navy crewmen, for a total of 4,267 people on board. Due to the rapid evacuation ahead of the Red Army's advance, many Eastern German and Baltic refugees boarded the Steuben without being registered, increasing the number of those on board to approximately 5,200.

Just before midnight on 9 February, the Soviet submarine S-13, commanded by Alexander Marinesko, fired two torpedoes 14 seconds apart at the Steuben; both hit her starboard bow, just below the bridge, where many of the crew were sleeping. Most were killed by the impact of the torpedoes. According to survivors, the Steuben sank by the bow and listed severely to starboard before taking her final plunge, within about 20 minutes of the torpedo impacts. An estimated 4,500 people died in the sinking. German torpedo boat T-196 hastily pulled up beside Steuben as she sank; its crew pulled about 300 survivors straight from Steuben'''s slanting decks and brought them to Kolberg in Pomerania (today Kołobrzeg, Poland). A total of 650 people were rescued from the Steuben.

Wreck

The Steuben wreck was found and identified in May 2004 by Polish Navy hydrographical vessel ORP Arctowski. Pictures and graphics appeared in a 2005 National Geographic article.

The ship was mostly intact when it was found.

In July 2021, German news magazine Der Spiegel reported that the wreck had been plundered and severely damaged in the process. The wreck is an official war grave, and entering it is illegal. Due to international treaties, the wreck remains property of the German state, but Poland is responsible for its protection. Over the past decade, looting has become one of the biggest reasons for the deteriorating condition of shipwrecks in the Baltic sea.

See also
 
 Iosif Stalin Goya 
 Thielbek MV Wilhelm Gustloff
 Armenia List by death toll of ships sunk by submarines

Footnotes

References
brief data sheet on the Dampfschiff General von Steuben
National Geographic story National Geographic Magazine, February, 2005, Marcin Jamkowski
Williams, David, Wartime Disasters at Sea'', Patrick Stephens Ltd., Nr Yeovil, UK, 1997, p. 228.

External links 

Video of diving the wreck of General von Steuben

1922 ships
Ships built in Stettin
Merchant ships of Germany
Steamships of Germany
Maritime incidents in 1930
World War II passenger ships of Germany
World War II auxiliary ships of Germany
World War II shipwrecks in the Baltic Sea
Ships sunk by Soviet submarines
Germany–Soviet Union relations
Maritime incidents in February 1945
Ships of Norddeutscher Lloyd
Auxiliary ships of the Kriegsmarine
Shipwrecks of Poland